Saul was, according to the Hebrew Bible, the first monarch of the United Kingdom of Israel. His reign, traditionally placed in the late 11th century BCE, supposedly marked the transition of Israel and Judah from a scattered tribal society ruled by various judges to organized statehood.

The historicity of Saul and the United Kingdom of Israel is not universally accepted, as what is known of both comes exclusively from the Hebrew Bible. According to the text, he was anointed as king of the Israelites by Samuel, and reigned from Gibeah. Saul is said to have died by suicide when he "fell on his sword" during a battle with the Philistines at Mount Gilboa, in which three of his sons were also killed. The succession to his throne was contested between Ish-bosheth, his only surviving son, and David, his son-in-law; David ultimately prevailed and assumed kingship over Israel and Judah.

Biblical account
The biblical accounts of Saul's life are found in the Books of Samuel:

House of King Saul
According to the Hebrew text of the Bible, Saul reigned for two years, but Biblical commentators generally agree that the text is faulty and that a reign of 20 or 22 years is more probable.. In the New Testament book of Acts 13:21, the Apostle Paul indicates that Saul’s reign was forty years. 

According to the Tanakh, Saul was the son of Kish, of the family of the Matrites, and a member of the tribe of Benjamin, one of the twelve Tribes of Israel. It appears that he came from Gibeah.

Saul married Ahinoam, daughter of Ahimaaz, with whom he sired at least seven sons (Jonathan, Abinadab, Malchishua, Ishvi, Armani, Mephibosheth and Ish-bosheth) and two daughters (Merab and Michal).

Saul also had a concubine named Rizpah, daughter of Aiah, who bore him two sons, Armoni and Mephibosheth.

Saul died at the Battle of Mount Gilboa, and was buried in Zelah, in the region of Benjamin. Three of Saul's sons – Jonathan, Abinadab, and Malchishua – died with him at Mount Gilboa. His surviving son Ish-bosheth became king of Israel, at the age of forty. At David's request Abner had Michal returned to David. Ish-bosheth reigned for two years, but after the death of Abner, was killed by two of his own captains.

During a famine, God told king David that the famine happened because of how Saul treated the Gibeonites. The Gibeonites told David that only the death of seven sons of Saul would compensate them for losing their livelihood after the priests at Nob were killed under Saul's orders. David then granted the Gibeonites the jurisdiction to individually execute Saul's surviving two sons and  five of Saul's grandsons (the sons of Merab and Adriel). The Gibeonites killed all seven, and hung up their bodies at the sanctuary at Gibeah. For five months their bodies were hung out in the elements, and the grieving Rizpah guarded them from being eaten by the beasts and birds of prey. Finally, David had the bodies taken down and buried in the family grave at Zelah with the remains of Saul and their half-brother Jonathan. Michal was childless.

The only male descendant of Saul to survive was Mephibosheth, Jonathan's lame son, who was five years old at the time of his father's and grandfather's deaths. In time, he came under the protection of David. Mephibosheth had a young son, Micah, who had four sons and descendants named until the ninth generation.

Anointed as king

The First Book of Samuel gives three accounts of Saul's rise to the throne in three successive chapters:

Saul is sent with a servant to look for his father's strayed donkeys. Leaving his home at Gibeah, they eventually arrive at the district of Zuph, at which point Saul suggests abandoning their search. Saul's servant tells him that they happen to be near the town of Ramah, where a famous seer is located, and suggests that they should consult him first. The seer (later identified by the text as Samuel) offers hospitality to Saul and later anoints him in private.
A popular movement having arisen to establish a centralized monarchy like other nations, Samuel assembles the people at Mizpah in Benjamin to appoint a king, fulfilling his previous promise to do so. Samuel organises the people by tribe and by clan. Using the Urim and Thummim, he selects the tribe of Benjamin, from within the tribe selecting the clan of Matri, and from them selecting Saul. After having been chosen as monarch, Saul returns to his home in Gibeah, along with a number of followers.  However, some of the people are openly unhappy with the selection of Saul.
The Ammonites, led by Nahash, lay siege to Jabesh-Gilead. Under the terms of surrender, the occupants of the city are to be forced into slavery and have their right eyes removed. Instead they send word of this to the other tribes of Israel, and the tribes west of the Jordan assemble an army under Saul. Saul leads the army to victory over the Ammonites, and the people congregate at Gilgal where they acclaim Saul as king and he is crowned.  Saul's first act is to forbid retribution against those who had previously contested his kingship.

André Lemaire finds the third account probably the most reliable tradition. The Pulpit Commentary distinguishes between a private and a public selection process.

Saul among the prophets
Having been anointed by Samuel, Saul is told of signs indicating that he has been divinely appointed. The last of these is that Saul will be met by an ecstatic group of prophets leaving a high place and playing the lyre, tambourine, and flutes. Saul encounters the ecstatic prophets and joins them. Later, Saul sends men to pursue David, but when they meet a group of ecstatic prophets playing music, they are overcome by the Spirit of God and join in giving prophetic words. Saul sends more men, but they too join the prophets. Eventually, Saul himself goes and also joins the prophets.

Military victories
After relieving the siege of Jabesh-Gilead, Saul conducts military campaigns against the Moabites, Ammonites, Edomites, Aram Rehob and the kings of Zobah, the Philistines, and the Amalekites. A biblical summary states that "wherever he turned, he was victorious".

In the second year of his reign, King Saul, his son Jonathan, and a small force of a few thousand Israelite soldiers defeated a massive Philistine force of 3,000 chariots, 6,000 horsemen, and more than 30,000 infantry in the pass of Michmash. After the battle, Saul instructs his armies, by a rash oath, to fast. Methodist commentator Joseph Benson suggests that "Saul's intention in putting this oath was undoubtedly to save time, lest the Philistines should gain ground of them in their flight. But the event showed it was a false policy; for the people were so faint and weak for want of food, that they were less able to follow and slay the Philistines than if they had stopped to take a moderate refreshment". Jonathan's party were not aware of the oath and ate honey, resulting in Jonathan realising that he had broken an oath of which he was not aware, but was nevertheless liable for its breach, until popular intervention allowed Jonathan to be saved from death on account of his victory over the Philistines.

Rejection

During Saul's campaign against the Philistines, Samuel said that he would arrive in seven days to perform the requisite rites. When a week passed with no word of Samuel, and with the Israelites growing restless, Saul prepares for battle by offering sacrifices. Samuel arrives just as Saul is finishing sacrificing and reprimands Saul for not obeying his instructions.

Several years after Saul's victory against the Philistines at Michmash Pass, Samuel instructs Saul to make war on the Amalekites and to "utterly destroy" them including all their livestock in fulfilment of a mandate set out:
When the Lord your God has given you rest from all your enemies on every hand, in the land that the Lord your God is giving you as an inheritance to possess, you shall blot out the remembrance of Amalek from under heaven; do not forget.
Having forewarned the Kenites who were living among the Amalekites to leave, Saul goes to war and defeats the Amalekites. Saul kills all the men, women, children and poor quality livestock, but leaves alive the king, Agag, and best livestock. When Samuel learns that Saul has not obeyed his instructions in full and tries to justify it by using the livestock to perform animal sacrifices in a self-righteous manner, he informs Saul that God has rejected him as king. As Samuel turns to go, Saul seizes hold of his garments and tears off a piece; Samuel prophesies that the kingdom will likewise be torn from Saul. Samuel then kills Agag himself. Samuel and Saul each return home and never meet again after these events.

Saul and David

After Samuel tells Saul that God has rejected him as king, David, a son of Jesse, from the tribe of Judah, enters the story: from this point on Saul's story is largely the account of his increasingly troubled relationship with David.

Samuel heads to Bethlehem, ostensibly to offer sacrifice and invited Jesse and his sons. Dining together, Jesse's sons are brought one by one to Samuel, each being rejected; at last, Jesse sends for David, the youngest, who is tending sheep. When brought to Samuel, David is anointed by him in front of his other brothers.
In 1 Samuel 16:25-23, Saul is troubled by an evil spirit sent by God. He requests soothing music, and a servant recommends David the son of Jesse, who is renowned for his skills as a harpist and other talents:
a son of Jesse the Bethlehemite, who is skillful in playing, a mighty man of valor, a man of war, prudent in speech, and a handsome person; and the Lord is with him
When word of Saul's needs reaches Jesse, he sends David, who had been looking after Jesse's flock, with gifts as a tribute, and David is appointed as Saul's armor bearer. With Jesse's permission he remains at court, playing the harp as needed to calm Saul during his troubled spells.
 The Philistines return with an army to attack Israel, and the Philistine and Israelite forces gather on opposite sides of a valley. The Philistine's champion Goliath issues a challenge for single combat, but none of the Israelite accept. David is described as a young shepherd who happens to be delivering food to his three eldest brothers in the army, and he hears Goliath's challenge. David speaks mockingly of the Philistines to some soldiers; his speech is overheard and reported to Saul, who summons David and appoints David as his champion. David easily defeats Goliath with a single shot from a sling. At the end of the passage, Saul asks his general, Abner, who David is.

Saul offered his elder daughter Merab as a wife to the now popular David, after his victory over Goliath, but David demurred. David distinguishes himself in the Philistine wars. Upon David's return from battle, the women praise him in song:
Saul has slain his thousands and David his tens of thousands 
implying that David is the greater warrior. Saul fears David's growing popularity and henceforth views him as a rival to the throne.

Saul's son Jonathan and David become close friends. Jonathan recognizes David as the rightful king, and "made a covenant with David, because he loved him as his own soul." Jonathan even gives David his military clothes, symbolizing David's position as successor to Saul.

On two occasions, Saul threw a spear at David as he played the harp for Saul. David becomes increasingly successful and Saul becomes increasingly resentful. Now Saul actively plots against David. Saul offered his other daughter, Michal in marriage to David. David initially rejects this offer also, claiming he is too poor. Saul offers to accept a bride price of 100 Philistine foreskins, intending that David die in the attempt. Instead, David obtains 200 foreskins and is consequently married to Michal. Jonathan arranges a short-lived reconciliation between Saul and David and for a while David served Saul "as in times past" until "the distressing spirit from the Lord" re-appeared. Saul sends assassins in the night, but Michal helps him escape, tricking them by placing a household idol in his bed. David flees to Jonathan, who arranges a meeting with his father. While dining with Saul, Jonathan explains David's absence, saying he has been called away to his brothers. But Saul sees through the ruse and reprimands Jonathan for protecting David, warning him that his love of David will cost him the kingdom, furiously throwing a spear at him. The next day, Jonathan meets with David and tells him Saul's intent. The two friends say their goodbyes, and David flees into the countryside. Saul later marries Michal to another man.

Saul is later informed by his head shepherd, Doeg the Edomite, that high priest Ahimelech assisted David, giving him the sword of Goliath, which had been kept at the temple at Nob. Doeg kills Ahimelech and eighty-five other priests and Saul orders the death of the entire population of Nob.

David had left Nob by this point and had amassed some 300 dissatisfied men, including some outlaws. With these men David rescues the town of  Keilah from a Philistine attack. Saul realises he could trap David and his men by laying the city to siege. David realizes that the citizens of Keilah will betray him to Saul. He flees to Ziph pursued by Saul. Saul hunts David in the vicinity of Ziph on two occasions:

Some of the inhabitants of Ziph betray David's location to Saul, but David hears about it and flees with his men to Maon. Saul follows David, but is forced to break off pursuit when the Philistines invade. After dealing with that threat Saul tracks David to the caves at Engedi. As he searches the cave David manages to cut off a piece of Saul's robe without being discovered, yet David restrains his men from harming the king. David then leaves the cave, revealing himself to Saul, and gives a speech that persuades Saul to reconcile.
On the second occasion, Saul returns to Ziph with his men. When David hears of this, he slips into Saul's camp by night, and again restrains his men from killing the king; instead he steals Saul's spear and water jug, leaving his own spear thrust into the ground by Saul's side. The next day, David reveals himself to Saul, showing the jug and spear as proof that he could have slain him. David then persuades Saul to reconcile with him; the two swear never to harm each other. After this they never see each other again.

Battle of Gilboa and the death of King Saul

The Philistines make war again, assembling at Shunem, and Saul leads his army to face them at Mount Gilboa. Before the battle he goes to consult a medium or witch at Endor. The medium, unaware of his identity, reminds him that the king has made witchcraft a capital offence, but he assures her that Saul will not harm her. She conjures a spirit which appears to be the prophet Samuel, and tells him that God has fully rejected him, will no longer hear his prayers, has given the kingdom to David and that the next day he will lose both the battle and his life. Saul collapses in fear, and the medium restores him with food in anticipation of the next day's battle.

Saul's death is described by the narrator (and also in 1 Chronicles 10) but a conflicting account is given by a young Amalekite who lies, thinking to win David's favour. The defeated Israelites flee from the enemy and Saul asks his armour bearer to kill him, but the armour bearer refuses, and so Saul falls upon his own sword. But the Amalekite tells David he found Saul leaning on his spear after the battle and delivered the coup de grâce. David has the Amalekite put to death, advancing the theme that David will never kill the Lord's anointed king (c.f. 1 Samuel 24, 26).

The victorious Philistines recover Saul's body as well as those of his three sons who also died in the battle, decapitate them and display them on the wall of Beth-shan. They display Saul's armour in the temple of Ashtaroth (an Ascalonian temple of the Canaanites). But at night the inhabitants of Jabesh-Gilead retrieve the bodies for cremation and burial. Later on, David takes the bones of Saul and of his son Jonathan and buries them in Zela, in the tomb of his father. The account in 1 Chronicles summarises by stating that:
Saul died for his unfaithfulness which he had committed against the Lord, because he did not keep the word of the Lord, and also because he consulted a medium for guidance.

Biblical criticism
There are several textual or narrative issues in the text, including the aforementioned conflicting accounts of Saul's rise to kingship and his death, as well as plays on words, that biblical scholars have discussed.

The birth-narrative of the prophet Samuel is found at 1 Samuel 1–28. It describes how Samuel's mother Hannah requests a son from Yahweh, and dedicates the child to God at the shrine of Shiloh. The passage makes extensive play with the root-elements of Saul's name, and ends with the phrase hu sa'ul le-Yahweh, "he is dedicated to Yahweh." Hannah names the resulting son Samuel, giving as her explanation, "because from God I requested him." Samuel's name, however, can mean "name of God," (or "Heard of God" or "Told of God") and the etymology and multiple references to the root of the name seems to fit Saul instead. The majority explanation for the discrepancy is that the narrative originally described the birth of Saul, and was given to Samuel in order to enhance the position of David and Samuel at the former king's expense.

The Bible's tone with regard to Saul changes over the course of the narrative, especially around the passage where David appears, midway through 1 Samuel. Before, Saul is presented in positive terms, but afterward his mode of ecstatic prophecy is suddenly described as fits of madness, his errors and disobedience to Samuel's instructions are stressed and he becomes a paranoiac. This may indicate that the David story is inserted from a source loyal to the House of David; David's lament over Saul in 2 Samuel 1 then serves an apologetic purpose, clearing David of the blame for Saul's death.

God's change of mind in rejecting Saul as king has raised questions about God's "repentance", which would be inconsistent with God's immutability.

In the narrative of Saul's private anointing in 1 Samuel 9:1-10:16, Saul is not referred to as a king (melech), but rather as a "leader" or "commander" (nagid) Saul is only given the title "king" (melech) at the public coronation ceremony at Gilgal.

Various authors have attempted to harmonize the two narratives regarding Saul's death. Josephus writes that Saul's attempted suicide was stalled because he was not able to run the sword through himself, and that he therefore asked the Amalekite to finish it. Later biblical criticism has posited that the story of Saul's death was redacted from various sources, although this view in turn has been criticized because it does not explain why the contradiction was left in by the redactors. But since 2 Samuel records only the Amalekite's report, and not the report of any other eye-witness, some scholars theorize that the Amalekite may have been lying to try to gain favor with David. On this view, 1 Samuel records what actually happened, while 2 Samuel records what the Amalekite claimed happened.

Classical rabbinical views
Two opposing views of Saul are found in classical rabbinical literature. One is based on the reverse logic that punishment is a proof of guilt, and therefore seeks to rob Saul of any halo which might surround him. The passage referring to Saul as a choice young man, and goodly is in this view interpreted as meaning that Saul was not good in every respect, but goodly only with respect to his personal appearance. According to this view, Saul is only a weak branch, owing his kingship not to his own merits, but rather to his grandfather, who had been accustomed to light the streets for those who went to the beit midrash, and had received as his reward the promise that one of his grandsons should sit upon the throne.

The second view of Saul makes him appear in the most favourable light as man, as hero, and as king. In this view, it was on account of his modesty that he did not reveal the fact that he had been anointed king; and he was extraordinarily upright as well as perfectly just. Nor was there any one more pious than he; for when he ascended the throne he was as pure as a child, and had never committed sin. He was marvelously handsome; and the maidens who told him concerning Samuel talked so long with him in order to observe his beauty for longer. In war he was able to march 120 miles without rest. When commanded to smite Amalek, Saul said: For one found slain the Torah requires a sin offering; and here so many shall be slain. If the old have sinned, why should the young suffer; and if men have been guilty, why should the cattle be destroyed? It was this humaneness which cost him his crown. And while Saul was merciful to his enemies, he was strict with his own people; when he found out that Ahimelech, a kohen, had assisted David with finding food, Saul, in retaliation, killed the remaining 85 kohanim of Ahimelech's family and the rest of his hometown, Nob. The fact that he was merciful even to his enemies, being indulgent to rebels themselves, and frequently waiving the homage due to him, was incredible as well as deceiving. But if his mercy toward a foe was a sin, it was his only one; it was his misfortune that it was reckoned against him, while David (who had committed many sins) was so favored that it was not remembered to his injury. In some respects Saul was superior to David, e.g., in having only one concubine (Rizpah), while David had many. Saul expended his own substance for the war, and although he knew that he and his sons would fall in battle, he nevertheless went forward, while David heeded the wish of his soldiers not to go to war in person.

According to the Rabbis, Saul followed the rules of ritual impurity prescribed for the sacrifice, and taught the people how they should slaughter cattle. As a reward for this, God himself gave Saul a sword on the day of battle, since no other sword suitable for him was found. Saul's attitude toward David was excused by arguing that his courtiers were all tale-bearers, and slandered David to him; and in like manner he was incited by Doeg against the priests of Nob—this act was forgiven him, however, and a heavenly voice (bat kol) was heard, proclaiming: Saul is the chosen one of God. His anger at the Gibeonites was not personal hatred, but was induced by zeal for the welfare of Israel. The fact that he made his daughter remarry finds its explanation in his (Saul's) view that her betrothal to David had been gained by false pretenses, and was therefore invalid. During the lifetime of Saul there was no idolatry in Israel. The famine in the reign of David, seemingly blamed on Saul, was in fact the people's fault, for not according Saul the proper honours at his burial. In Sheol, Samuel reveals to Saul that in the next world, Saul would dwell with Samuel, which is a proof that all has been forgiven him by God.

In Islam
Some Muslims refer to Saul as Ṭālūt, and believe that (as in the Bible) he was the commander of Israel. Other scholars, however, have identified Talut as Gideon with the reasoning that the Qur'an references the same incident of the drinking from the river as that found in Judges 7:5–7 and other factors associated with Gideon. According to the Qur'an, Talut was chosen by the Prophet Samuel (not mentioned by name explicitly, but rather as "a Prophet" of the Israelites) after being asked by the people of Israel for a King to lead them into war. The Israelites criticized Samuel for appointing Talut, lacking respect for Talut because he was not wealthy. Samuel rebuked the people for this and told them that Talut was more favored than they were. Talut led the Israelites to victory over the army of Goliath, who was killed by Dawud (David). Talut is not considered a Nabi (Prophet), but a Divinely appointed King.

Name
The name 'Ṭālūt' has uncertain etymology. Unlike some other Qur'anic figures, the Arabic name is not similar to the Hebrew name (Sha'ul). According to Muslim exegetes, the name 'Ṭālūt' means 'Tall' (from the Arabic "tūl") and refers to the extraordinary stature of Saul, which would be consistent with the Biblical account. In explanation of the name, exegetes such as Tha'labi hold that at this time, the future King of Israel was to be recognised by his height; Samuel set up a measure, but no one in Israel reached its height except Ṭālūt (Saul).

Saul as the King of Israel
In the Qur'an, Israelites demanded a King after the time of Musa (Moses). God appointed Talut as their King. Saul was distinguished by the greatness of his knowledge and of his physique; it was a sign of his role as King that God brought back the Ark of the Covenant for Israel. Talut tested his people at a river; whoever drank from it would not follow him in battle excepting one who takes [from it] in the hollow of his hand. Many drank but only the faithful ventured on. In the battle, however, David slew Goliath and was made the subsequent King of Israel.

The Qur'anic account differs from the Biblical account (if Saul is assumed to be Talut) in that in the Bible the sacred Ark was returned to Israel before Saul's accession, and the test by drinking water is made in the Hebrew Bible not by Saul but by Gideon.

Historicity

The historicity of Saul's kingdom is not universally accepted and there is insufficient extrabiblical evidence to verify if the biblical account reflects historical reality. While several scholars believe that the existence of the United Monarchy is corroborated by archaeological evidence, although with considerable theological exaggerations, others, like Israel Finkelstein, believe it to be a late ideological construct.

In the Jewish Study Bible (2014), Oded Lipschits states the concept of United Monarchy should be abandoned, while Aren Maeir highlights the lack of evidence about the United Monarchy. However, in his books Beyond the Texts (2018) and Has Archeology Buried the Bible? (2020) William G. Dever has defended the historicity of the United Monarchy, maintaining that the reigns of Saul, David and Solomon are "reasonably well attested". Similar arguments were advanced by Amihai Mazar in a 2013 essay, which points toward archaeological evidence emerged from excavation sites in Jerusalem by Eilat Mazar and in Khirbet Qeiyafa by Yosef Garfinkel. Archeology seems to confirm that until about 1000 BCE, the end of Iron Age I, Israelite society was essentially a society of farmers and stockbreeders without any truly centralized organization and administration.

Psychological analyses
Accounts of Saul's behavior have made him a popular subject for speculation among modern psychiatrists. George Stein views the passages depicting Saul's ecstatic episodes as suggesting that he may have suffered from mania. Martin Huisman sees the story of Saul as illustrative of the role of stress as a factor in depression. Liubov Ben-Noun of Ben-Gurion University of the Negev, believes that passages referring to King Saul's disturbed behavior indicate he was afflicted by a mental disorder, and lists a number of possible conditions.  However, Christopher C. H. Cook of the Department of Theology and Religion, Durham University, UK recommends caution in offering any diagnoses in relation to people who lived millennia ago.

See also
David in Islam
Kings of Israel and Judah
Midrash Samuel
Paul the Apostle (also named Saul of Tarsus as a Pharisee)

References

Bibliography
Driver, S. R., Notes on the Hebrew Text of the Books of Samuel, 1890
Cheyne, T. K., Aids to the Devout Study of Criticism, 1892, pp. 1–126
Kent, Grenville J.R. (2014-01-01). ""Call up Samuel": Who Appeared to the Witch at En-Dor? (1 Samuel 28:3-25)". Andrews University Seminary Studies (AUSS). 52 (2). ISSN 0003-2980.
Smith, H. P., Old Testament History, 1903, ch. vii.
Cheyne, T. K., and Black, (eds.) Encyclopedia Biblica
SAMUEL AND SAUL: A NEGATIVE SYMBIOSIS by Rabbi Moshe Reiss
Hudson, J. Francis, 'Rabshakeh' [Lion Publishing 1992] is a fictionalisation of Saul's tragedy.
Green, A., 'King Saul, The True History of the First Messiah' [Lutterworth Press 2007]

External links

11th-century BC Kings of Israel (united monarchy)
Ancient people who committed suicide
Founding monarchs
House of Saul
People associated with David
People whose existence is disputed